Sabi may refer to:
 A member of an ethnoreligious group known as the Mandaeans (Sabians), in Arabic
 Sabi (Korea), an ancient capital of Baekje
 Sabi (dog), an Australian special forces dog
 Save River (Africa), flows through Zimbabwe and Mozambique
 Sabi Forest Park, The Gambia
 Wabi-sabi, a Japanese aesthetic term
 Sabi (singer), the stage name of American singer Jenice Portlock
 Sabi Island, near the southern end of Myanmar
 Sabi Sabi, a private game reserve in South Africa
 Sabi languages, a group of Bantu languages